James Whitbread Lee Glaisher FRS FRSE FRAS (5 November 1848, Lewisham – 7 December 1928, Cambridge), son of James Glaisher and Cecilia Glaisher, was a prolific English mathematician and astronomer.  His large collection of (mostly) English ceramics was mostly left to the Fitzwilliam Museum in Cambridge.

Life

He was born in Lewisham in Kent on 5 November 1848 the son of the eminent astronomer  James Glaisher and his wife, Cecilia Louisa Belville. His mother was a noted photographer.

He was educated at St Paul's School from 1858. He became somewhat of a school celebrity in 1861 when he made two hot-air balloon ascents with his father to study the stratosphere.

He won a Campden Exhibition Scholarship allowing him to study at Trinity College, Cambridge, where he was second wrangler in 1871 and was made a Fellow of the college. Influential in his time on teaching at the University of Cambridge, he is now remembered mostly for work in number theory that anticipated later interest in the detailed properties of modular forms. He published widely over other fields of mathematics.

Glaisher was elected FRS in 1875. He was the editor-in-chief of Messenger of Mathematics. He was also the 'tutor' of the philosopher Ludwig Wittgenstein (tutor being a non-academic role in Cambridge University).  He was president of the Royal Astronomical Society 1886–1888 and 1901–1903. When George Biddell Airy retired as Astronomer Royal in 1881 it is said that Glaisher was offered the post but declined.

He lived in a set of rooms at Trinity College. He died there on 7 December 1928.

He was a keen cyclist but preferred his penny-farthing to the newer "safety" bicycles. He was President of Cambridge University Cycling Club 1882 to 1885. He was a keen collector of English Delftware and other popular English pottery, much of it then below the notice of other collectors.  The university indulged him by allowing him a room of the Fitzwilliam Museum to house his personal collection. He also amassed a collection of some 1,600 valentines, which he bequeathed to the museum.

Awards
Honorary doctorate (DSc) from the University of Dublin in 1892
Honorary doctorate (DSc) from Manchester University in 1902
Winner of the London Mathematical Society's De Morgan Medal in 1908
Winner of the Royal Society's Sylvester Medal in 1913

Publications

Glaisher published many papers and was editor and contributor to both the Messenger of Mathematics and the Quarterly Journal of Mathematics.

See also
Glaisher's theorem
Glaisher–Kinkelin constant

References

External links

1848 births
1928 deaths
19th-century English mathematicians
20th-century English mathematicians
Number theorists
Alumni of Trinity College, Cambridge
People educated at St Paul's School, London
Second Wranglers
Fellows of the Royal Society
Honorary Fellows of the Royal Society of Edinburgh
People from Lewisham
19th-century British astronomers
Fellows of Trinity College, Cambridge
De Morgan Medallists
Presidents of the Royal Astronomical Society
James Whitbread Lee
20th-century British astronomers